Robert Edmund Dickinson (1862–1947) was an English banker and Conservative Party politician.

Life
The son of Edmund Henry Dickinson (1821–1896), son of William Dickinson (1771–1837), and his wife Emily Dulcibella Eden, daughter of Robert Eden, 3rd Baron Auckland, Bishop of Bath and Wells, he was from a Somerset background, but was born near London on 1 August 1862. He was educated at Eton College, and matriculated at Trinity College, Cambridge in 1880, graduating B.A. in 1884.

Dickinson went to work in Stuckey's Bank. He was a Justice of the Peace for Somerset, and an officer in the Somerset Imperial Yeomanry. He was a resident of The Albany from 1902 to 1910. In the January 1910 general election he contested  unsuccessfully, losing narrowly to the Liberal Sir William Job Collins.

In 1913 Dickinson was working for Parr's Bank, which took over Stuckey's Bank; technically this was an amalgamation, and when it was carried out on 1909, Dickinson was a director of Stuckey's. Later he was a director of the Westminster Bank and the Standard Bank of South Africa.

Dickinson died in 1947.

Notes

1862 births
1947 deaths
British bankers
Members of the Parliament of the United Kingdom for English constituencies
People educated at Eton College
Alumni of Trinity College, Cambridge
UK MPs 1895–1900
UK MPs 1900–1906
Mayors of Bath, Somerset